Hugh Douglas may refer to:

Hugh the Dull, Lord of Douglas (1294–c. 1342), Scottish cleric and nobleman
Hugh Douglas, Earl of Ormonde (died 1455), Scottish nobleman and soldier
Hugh Douglas (minister) (1911–1986), Moderator of the General Assembly of the Church of Scotland
Hugh Douglas (American football) (born 1971), American football player

See also